Damir Biškup (born 3 December 1969) is a Croatian retired football defender and later manager.

References

1969 births
Living people
Association football defenders
Yugoslav footballers
Croatian footballers
NK Zagreb players
GNK Dinamo Zagreb players
HNK Orijent players
NK Zadar players
Chemnitzer FC players
Croatian Football League players
2. Bundesliga players
Croatian expatriate footballers
Expatriate footballers in Germany
Croatian expatriate sportspeople in Germany
Croatian football managers
NK Hrvatski Dragovoljac managers
Croatian Football League managers